"The Right Kind of Love" is a song by American recording artist Jeremy Jordan. The single was released in late 1992 as one of the lead tracks from the Beverly Hills 90210 soundtrack, later appearing on his debut album, Try My Love (1993), on Giant Records. Written and produced by Tommy Faragher, Lotti Golden and Robbie Nevil, the song became an international hit, peaking at number 14 on the US Billboard Hot 100 and number five in Australia.

Critical reception
Tom Doyle from Smash Hits gave the song three out of five, describing it as "bumpy grindy soul stuff". He added that it "it's a very convincing New Kids impersonation which will very likely turn Mr Jordan into an international pop sensation."

Track listing
 US maxi-CD single
 "The Right Kind of Love" (main mix—no rap) – 4:09
 "The Right Kind of Love" (main mix) – 4:09
 "The Right Kind of Love" (radio fade mix) – 4:09
 "The Right Kind of Love" (Hip Hop Jeep mix) – 5:45
 "The Right Kind of Love" (Quiet Storm mix) – 5:45

Charts

Weekly charts

Year-end charts

References

1992 debut singles
1992 songs
Giant Records (Warner) singles
Songs written by Lotti Golden
Songs written by Robbie Nevil
Songs written by Tommy Faragher